The archaeological La Jolla complex (Shell Midden People, Encinitas Tradition, Millingstone Horizon) represents a prehistoric culture oriented toward coastal resources that prevailed during the middle Holocene period between c. 8000 BC and AD 500 in southwestern California and northwestern Baja California.

Description
Characteristics of the La Jolla complex include hand stones and basin or slab milling stones (manos and metates), rough percussion-flaked stone edge tools, flexed burials, and extensive exploitation of shellfish, particularly venus clam (Chione spp.), scallop (Argopecten aequisulcatus), mussel (Mytilus californianus), and oyster (Ostrea lurida). Cogged stones and discoidals are distinctive but unusual artifacts. Other uncommon artifacts include shell ornaments (primarily spire-removed Olivella spp. beads) and projectile points (Pinto, Gypsum, and Elko forms). Bones from sea mammals and fish occur in La Jollan middens, but they are not abundant. Fish remains usually represent near-shore species, pointing to a littoral rather than maritime economy.

The La Jolla complex was initially characterized as the Shell Midden people by Malcolm J. Rogers, the region's pioneering archaeologist. Rogers distinguished successive phases for the complex. Subsequent investigators have sometimes proposed modified versions of Rogers' phase sequence, but the most striking characteristics of the complex may be its comparatively simple material remains and its long cultural continuity, at least in the San Diego region. Claude N. Warren relabelled the complex as the Encinitas Tradition, which extended as far north as the Santa Barbara Channel region but was replaced by the Campbell tradition in its northern reaches after about 2000 BC. An inland counterpart of the La Jolla complex was the Pauma complex.

Human remains
Two human skeletons, a male and a female, were found in La Jolla, California, in 1976; they date back at least 9,500 years. They were found during construction work on a house. They were the subject of a decade-long legal battle.

The University of California decided to return the remains to one of the local Kumeyaay Indian bands. This was done in 2016.

See also
 San Diego Historical Landmarks in La Jolla
 Paleo-indians

Notes

References

 Gallegos, Dennis R. (editor). 1987. San Dieguito-La Jolla: Chronology and Controversy. San Diego County Archaeological Society Research Paper No. 1.
 Moratto, Michael J. 1984. California Archaeology. Academic Press, Orlando, Florida.
 Rogers, Malcolm J. 1929. "The Stone Art of the San Dieguito Plateau". American Anthropologist 31:454-467.
 Rogers, Malcolm J. 1945. "An Outline of Yuman Prehistory". Southwestern Journal of Anthropology 1:167-198.
 Warren, Claude N. 1968. "Cultural Tradition and Ecological Adaptation on the Southern California Coast". In Archaic Prehistory in the Western United States, edited by Cynthia Irwin-Williams, pp. 1–14. Eastern New Mexico University Contributions in Anthropology No. 1(3). Portales.

Pre-Columbian cultures
Native American history of California
Archaeological cultures of North America
Archaeological sites in California
Archaeological sites in Baja California
History of San Diego
History of San Diego County, California
6th-millennium BC establishments
6th-century disestablishments in North America
Oldest human remains in the Americas